Scaphios is a genus of spiders in the family Oonopidae. It was first described in 2010 by Platnick & Dupérré. , it contains 8 species, all found in Ecuador and Colombia.

Species
Scaphios comprises the following species:
Scaphios cayambe Platnick & Dupérré, 2010
Scaphios jatun Platnick & Dupérré, 2010
Scaphios napo Platnick & Dupérré, 2010
Scaphios orellana Platnick & Dupérré, 2010
Scaphios planada Platnick & Dupérré, 2010
Scaphios puyo Platnick & Dupérré, 2010
Scaphios wagra Platnick & Dupérré, 2010
Scaphios yanayacu Platnick & Dupérré, 2010

References

Oonopidae
Araneomorphae genera
Spiders of South America